The 2011 North Dakota State Bison football team represented North Dakota State University in the 2011 NCAA Division I FCS football season. The Bison were led by ninth year head coach Craig Bohl and played their home games at the Fargodome. They are a member of the Missouri Valley Football Conference. They finished the season 14–1, 7–1 in MVFC play to share the conference title with Northern Iowa. This was the last season until the December 9th 2017 FCS Semifinal game against Wofford that the Home Attendance at the FargoDome was under 18,000. They received the conference's automatic bid into the FCS playoffs, their second FCS playoff bid in school history, where they advanced to the National Championship Game and defeated Sam Houston State to win their first FCS National Championship.

Schedule

Coaching staff

References

North Dakota State
North Dakota State Bison football seasons
NCAA Division I Football Champions
Missouri Valley Football Conference champion seasons
North Dakota State
North Dakota State Bison football